Xenotrichulidae is a family of worms belonging to the order Chaetonotida.

Genera:
 Draculiciteria Hummon, 1974
 Heteroxenotrichula Wilke, 1954
 Xenotrichula Remane, 1927

References

Gastrotricha